Novy Kichkinyash (Yañı Keskenäş) is a rural locality (a village) in Starotumbagushevsky Selsoviet, Sharansky District, Bashkortostan, Russia. The population was 39 as of 2010. There is 1 street.

Geography 
Novy Kichkinyash is located 13 km north of Sharan (the district's administrative centre) by road. Stary Kichkinyash is the nearest rural locality.

References 

Rural localities in Sharansky District